Golazin Ardestani (Persian: گل آذین اردستانی), better known by her stage name Gola or Golazin (Persian:گل آذین), is an Iranian singer-songwriter, musicologist, vocalist and actress based in London. She plays piano, santur, dammam (Persian percussion) and the flute.

Early life 
Ardestani grew up in Isfahan, Iran. She studied music composition and performance at Tehran's University of Soureh. In 2011, she moved to London to pursue a master's degree in music psychology at Roehampton University.

Career 
When she was 19, Gola joined Iran's first girlband, Orchid, which was only allowed to play before a female audience in Iran because of local laws. She was arrested three times in Iran. Following her tours with Orchid, she honed her own tastes as an artist and garnered a fervent fan base.

The restrictions in place for female singers in Iran, and political unrest, fueled Golazin's decision to move to London in 2011. Her debut single, "Miri", received over 3 million listens on Radio Javan.

In 2018, Gola released the single "The Line", her first track in English. Her single "Booseh" was streamed more than 800,000 times in the month after its release. She released the single “Now You Know” in 2019. She has worked alongside Idan Raichel and Iranian rapper Hossein Tohi. Gola creates music influenced by both Eastern and Western music, with an underlying message of raising awareness of Iran.

Discography

Persian singles
 Miri 
 Khoda Danad 
 Booseh 
 Bi Gonah
 Hess
 Iranian
 Eshghe Ariaei
 Behtarin Abi
 Khodam Boodam Oonja
 Raghse Shirin
 Betars Az Man
 Khodavanda
 Khosh Be Halam

English singles
 The Line
 Now You Know

References

External links
 

Year of birth missing (living people)
Living people
21st-century Iranian women singers
Musicians from Isfahan